Aba Khel may refer to:

 Aba Khel (tribe), the subtribe of Mandanr Yusafzai Pashtun tribe in Swabi District of North West Frontier Province of Pakistan
 Aba Khel, FATA, a town in the Federally Administered Tribal Areas of Pakistan
 Aba Khel, Tank, a village of Tank District in Khyber Pakhtunkhwa district, Pakistan
 Aba Khel, Khyber Pakhtunkhwa, a village in Pakistan